Circular knitting or knitting in the round is a form of knitting that creates a seamless tube. Work in the round is begun by casting on stitches as for flat knitting but then joining the ends of that row of  stitches to form a circle. Knitting is worked in rounds (the equivalent of the rows in flat knitting), which forms the tube by winding around in a helix.

Originally, circular knitting was done using a set of four or five double-pointed needles. Today, knitters often use instead a circular needle, which resembles a pair of short knitting needles connected by a cable between them. Circular knitting can also be performed by knitting machines: a double-bed machine can be set up to knit on its front bed in one direction and then its back bed on the return, which creates the tube. Specialized knitting machines for sock-knitting use individual latch-hook needles to make each stitch in a round frame.

Many types of sweaters are traditionally knit in the round. Planned openings (arm holes, necks, cardigan fronts) are temporarily knitted with extra stitches, reinforced if necessary. Then the extra stitches are cut to create the opening, and are stitched with a sewing machine to prevent unraveling.  This technique is called steeking.

Magic loop technique 
Invented by Sarah Hauschka and first described in Beverly Galeskas’s booklet The Magic Loop, this technique uses a long circular knitting needle (for instance 40 inches) to knit projects (of any circumference substantially less than the needle length) in the round. The key is pulling a loop of extra cable out between the stitches halfway through the round.

The magic loop technique also allows knitting two-at-a-time projects like pairs of socks or the sleeves of sweaters. This knitting both pieces at once makes it easier to render the two as similar as possible.

Spool and machine circular knitting 

Spool knitting is a form of circular knitting using pegs rather than needles, one peg per stitch. A variant automates the stitching action, thus producing a hand-crank circular knitting machine. Commercial knitting machines are heavy-duty powered versions of the hand-cranked ones; they may knit multiple threads at once, for speed.

Notes

Further reading 
Allen, Pam, Trisha Malcolm, Rich Tennant, and Cheryl Fall (2002). Knitting for Dummies. New York: Hungry Minds, Inc. 
Breiter, Barbara, and Gail Diven (2003). The Complete Idiot's Guide to Knitting and Crocheting Illustrated, 2nd Edition. New York: Alpha Books. 
Galeskas, Bev (2002). The Magic Loop: Working Around on One Needle. Fiber Trends. (Sixth edition )
Hiatt, June Hemmons (1989). The Principles of Knitting: Methods and Techniques of Hand Knitting. New York: Simon & Schuster. 
Rutt, Richard (2003). A History of Handknitting. Loveland, CO: Interweave Press. (Reprint edition )
Zimmermann, Elizabeth (1972). Knitting Without Tears. New York: Simon & Schuster. (Reprint edition )

External links 

 "Large and Small Diameter Circular Knitting videos" from KnittingHelp
 "How to knit with one circular" from WeebleKnits
 "How to knit with two circulars" from WeebleKnits
 "How to knit small circumferences using one long circular needle" from WeebleKnits

Knitting